Kitchen Sink was American cooking-themed television series that aired on Food Network. It was presented by a rotating lineup of chefs who taught the viewers how to create different indulgent recipes. During the first season, the series was titled The Kitchen Sink.

The series is a spin-off of The Kitchen. However, unlike The Kitchen, it did not have a studio audience; and it ran for 22 minutes instead of 41 minutes.

Episodes

Season 1 (2016)

Season 2 (2017)

Notes

References

External links
 
 
 bstventertainment.com

2010s American cooking television series
2016 American television series debuts
2017 American television series endings
American television spin-offs
English-language television shows
Food Network original programming
Food reality television series
Reality television spin-offs